Liv Stubberud (29 May 1930, in Rakkestad – 16 September 1997) was a Norwegian politician in the Labour Party.

She was elected to the Norwegian Parliament from Østfold in 1973 and was re-elected on three occasions. She had previously served as a deputy representative during the terms 1965–1969 and 1969–1973. From September to October 1973 she served as a regular representative, filling in for Martha Frederikke Johannessen, who had died.

On the local level she was a member of Rakkestad municipality council from 1963 to 1975.

References

1930 births
1997 deaths
People from Rakkestad
Members of the Storting
Labour Party (Norway) politicians
Østfold politicians
Women members of the Storting
20th-century Norwegian women politicians
20th-century Norwegian politicians